Coleus maculosus is a species of flowering plant in the family Lamiaceae. It is widespread in tropical Africa and Madagascar.

Three subspecies have been described:
Coleus maculosus subsp. maculosus – Cameroon to Eritrea and Tanzania, Madagascar.
Coleus maculosus subsp. edulis (Vatke) A.J.Paton, syn. Plectranthus edulis (Vatke) Agnew – Ethiopia, Kenya, Uganda, Tanzania, Burundi, Rwanda and the Democratic Republic of the Congo
Coleus maculosus subsp. lanatus (J.K.Morton) A.J.Paton – Cameroon

References

maculosus
Flora of Africa